Svante Rasmuson (born 18 November 1955) is a Swedish modern pentathlete and fencer. He won a bronze medal in the modern pentathlon event with his team at the 1980 Summer Olympics and a silver medal at the 1984 Summer Olympics.

References 

1955 births
Living people
Sportspeople from Uppsala
Olympic modern pentathletes of Sweden
Swedish male modern pentathletes
Swimmers at the 1976 Summer Olympics
Modern pentathletes at the 1980 Summer Olympics
Modern pentathletes at the 1984 Summer Olympics
Modern pentathletes at the 1988 Summer Olympics
Olympic silver medalists for Sweden
Olympic bronze medalists for Sweden
Olympic medalists in modern pentathlon
Medalists at the 1984 Summer Olympics
Medalists at the 1980 Summer Olympics
20th-century Swedish people
21st-century Swedish people